Bellocchi is a surname. Notable people with the surname include:

Gianni Bellocchi (born 1969), Italian scientist
Natale H. Bellocchi (1926–2014), American industrial engineer, veteran, and diplomat